The Yamaha P-85 is an entry-level digital piano introduced in 2007. It is the successor of the Yamaha P-70 and introduces a MIDI sequencer.

The P-85 features 10 different patches (2 acoustic pianos, 2 electric pianos, 2 harpsichords, 2 church organs, strings, and vibes), some of which are in stereo and use multi-sampling. The action used is Yamaha's GHS (Graded Hammer Standard). The P-85 weighs about 25 lbs (11.6 kg) and has two 6.3 mm headphone jacks in the front. It can be used in conjunction with the L-85 wooden stand and the LP-5 three-pedal unit.

The P-85 is alternatively also available in silver (P-85S) instead of black. The successor to the P-85 is the Yamaha P-95, introduced in 2010.

Support
The P-85 is now replaced by a newer model and parts and service are no longer supported.  However a service manual is online with detailed schematics as well as a well-marked PCB to allow anyone with some electronics background to resolve basic problems as the products age.

Features
 50 built-demo songs and 10 patch demos
 MIDI sequencer, capacity about 11,000 notes
 Half-pedaling support; metronome; reverb; layering
 20 W power consumption
 6 W amplifiers

See also
Yamaha P-115
Yamaha P-120
Yamaha P-250

References

External links
Yamaha P85 Digital Piano
Yamaha P71 88 Key Digital Piano
Classical Piano Pieces for Intermediate Players

P-85